The Northern Ireland Squirrel Association was a youth organization which operated solely within Northern Ireland. It was a feeder organization to the Scout Movement in Northern Ireland as its membership was limited to four and five year olds who lived in Northern Ireland. The Aim of the Association was '…to promote the development of young people in achieving their full physical, intellectual, social and spiritual potential, as individuals, as responsible citizens and as members of their local, national and international communities.'

The Northern Ireland Squirrel Association became affiliated in 2009 with the Northern Ireland Scout Council which is part of The Scout Association. Each unit is called a Squirrel Drey and some are linked to Scout Groups.

Following a piloting exercising from 2019, The Scout Association launched its Squirrels nationally in 2021. The operations of the Northern Ireland Squirrel Association were merged into the Scout Association's Squirrels.

Youth programme
From late 2014 a badge programme was used which more closely aligned with the programme of The Scout Association. Four Smile badges could be awarded: 
 Yellow: I'm active for taking part in new and energetic activities while learning about healthy eating and nourishing energy giving foods.	
 Blue: I'm learning for learning new crafts, games and special skills while learning about being safe at home and outdoors and developing personal skills.
 Green: I'm friendly for making friends in the Squirrel Drey.
 Orange: I'm caring for care about what they do - how they behave, how they treat others and the world around them.

The development of this programme was funded by the Big Lottery Fund.

Uniform

Youth uniform
	
Youth members wore a loose-fitting navy sweatshirt and were allowed to wear the scarf of a Scout Group with which they were linked. The provincial, county and district badges of The Scout Association could also be worn on the right arm. The Squirrel membership badge was worn on the left breast of the sweatshirt.

Adult uniform

Following the affiliation with the Northern Ireland Scout Council there was a suggestion that Squirrel leaders should wear the adult uniform shirt of The Scout Association. This brought its own confusion for leaders who were also adult members of The Scout Association, as Squirrel Leaders were not able to wear the Membership Badge as the organization was not a member of the World Organization of the Scout Movement. Many Squirrel Leaders wore navy tops. After 2013 a new navy and lime Squirrel Association logo badge was worn on the right breast of such uniform.

References

Youth organisations based in Northern Ireland	
Scouting and Guiding in Ireland
Scouting and Guiding in the United Kingdom
The Scout Association
Education companies established in 2014